Coldstream is a locality and township within Greater Melbourne beyond the Melbourne metropolitan area Urban Growth Boundary, 36 km north-east from Melbourne's central business district, located within the Shire of Yarra Ranges local government area. Coldstream recorded a population of 2,199 at the 2021 census.

History
The township developed around the railway station after the railway arrived in 1888, the Post Office opening on 7 February 1889. Prior to that the locality was known as "The Lodge".

In 1909, Dame Nellie Melba bought Coombe Cottage at Coldstream. The house is located at the junction of Maroondah Highway and Melba Highway (named in her honour).  It became the home of Melba's granddaughter, Lady Pamela Vestey, until her death in 2011.  It is now the property of Lady Vestey's son, Sam (3rd Baron Vestey), who resides in the United Kingdom.

Today
Coldstream has a local primary school, community centre, landfill and several farms. The Coldstream Timber and Hardware company have premises on Maroondah Highway. Coldstream is also home to the Coldstream Brewery, which opened in June 2007 and has its restaurant open 7 days a week. It had a railway station that closed to passengers in 1983, but was used for freight purposes up until 1992 when it closed after the buildings were destroyed by fire.

Coldstream Airport is owned by the Doake Family and has been in operation since the early 1960s. 
It is home to:—
 a flying school currently operated by Yarra Valley Flight Training,
 An aero club, the Coldstream Flyers Club, and
 Many private aircraft.

Coldstream has an active CFA (Country Fire Authority) volunteer fire brigade established after the serious fires of 1962. This was essentially a name change from the Lilydale Rural Fire Brigade originally established in 1939 as the Lilydale Bushfire Brigade, changing its name in 1945 on the establishment of the CFA (Country Fire Authority).

On clear winter mornings Coldstream is one of the coldest places around Melbourne, with the temperature dropping below 0 °C (32 °F) on several mornings each year (it very rarely drops below 2 °C in the centre of Melbourne). Overall, the daily minimum temperatures are even lower than nearby Mount Dandenong despite being much closer to sea level.

The Bureau of Meteorology operates an automatic weather station at Coldstream Airfield. A private automatic weather station is also maintained in the Coldstream Estate.

The Domaine Chandon Australia winery, sister to Domaine Chandon California, a division of Moët & Chandon, is located there.

Population
In the 2016 Census, there were 2,164 people in Coldstream.  83.3% of people were born in Australia. The next most common country of birth was England at 4.9%. 91.4% of people spoke only English at home. The most common responses for religion were No Religion 42.5%, Catholic 20.5% and Anglican 12.1%.

Climate
Coldstream has an oceanic climate that is transitional with the warmer interior climates, resulting in higher summer daytime temps than on the Victorian coastline. Averages even out due to lower overnight lows, where Coldstream can get close to freezing even in the midst of summer. Precipitation is relatively uniform throughout the year, although summers are slightly drier than winters.

Sport
The town has an Australian Rules football team, The Coldstream Cougars, competing in the Eastern Football League.

Coldstream also has Netball club.

See also
 Coldstream railway station, Melbourne

References

External links

Australian Places - Coldstream
Yarra Valley Flight Training
Coldstream Flyers Club
 ACMA
 Coldstream Group Page for Locals

Yarra Valley
Yarra Ranges